Moon Maan is the solo project of Rick McCollum of The Afghan Whigs.

Moon Maan debuted at SXSW in 2004 and has a rotating cast of musicians, most notably Polara drummer Erik Mathison.  McCollum, now based in Minneapolis, Minnesota, United States, is currently working on his junior effort and recently collaborated with female-fronted act Glean.

References

Musical groups established in 2004